The Kurds in Azerbaijan,, form a part of the historically significant Kurdish population in the post-Soviet space. Kurds established a presence in the Caucasus with the establishment of the Kurdish Shaddadid dynasty in the tenth and eleventh centuries. Some Kurdish tribes were recorded in Karabakh by the end of the sixteenth century. However, virtually the entire contemporary Kurdish population in the Republic of Azerbaijan descends from migrants from 19th-century Qajar Iran.

As a result of 2020 Nagorno-Karabakh war, Azerbaijan took back Kalbajar, Lachin, Qubadli and Zangilan. According to 2020 Nagorno-Karabakh ceasefire agreement, internally displaced persons and refugees shall return to the territory of Nagorno-Karabakh and adjacent areas under the supervision of the United Nations High Commissioner for Refugees.

History

Early history 
According to Russian and later Soviet ethnographer Grigory Chursin, another wave of Kurdish immigration in western parts of modern Azerbaijan may have taken place in 1589, at the time of the Ottoman–Safavid War, when "victorious Safavid soldiers" chose to stay in the conquered lands. Safavids resettled Shi'a Kurds where borders of the historical regions of Karabakh and Zangezur met. In the eighteenth century, many Kurdish tribes had formed tribal unions with Azeris in Karabakh lowlands. Nineteenth-century Russian historian Peter Budkov mentioned that in 1728, groups of Kurds and Shahsevans engaged in semi-nomadic cattle-breeding in the Mughan plain applied for Russian citizenship.

In 1807, amidst the Russo-Persian War over the South Caucasus, a tribe chief by the name of Mehmed Sefi Sultan moved from Persian to the Karabakh khanate followed by 600 Kurdish families. By the second half of the nineteenth century, Kurds were found in large numbers in the uyezds of Zangezur, Javanshir and Jabrayil. In 1886, they constituted 4.68% of the population of the Elisabethpol Governorate. Small populations of Kurds were also found in the uyezds of Nakhchivan, Sharur-Daralagoz and Aresh. Mass migration of Kurds from Persia and to a lesser degree from the Ottoman Empire into mountainous regions of present-day Azerbaijan continued all throughout the nineteenth and early twentieth century, until 1920 when Azerbaijan became part of the Soviet Union. The Kurdish population of the South Caucasus was prone to internal immigration. In the 1920s, a number of Kurds from Azerbaijan relocated to Armenia where they settled mainly in the Azeri-populated regions, which led the Kurdish population of Azerbaijan to significantly decrease in numbers.

Common religion (unlike the majority of Kurds, Kurds of Azerbaijan are predominantly Shi'a Muslim like most Azeris) and shared elements of culture led to rapid assimilation of Azerbaijan's Kurdish population already by the end of the nineteenth century. Statistical data from 1886 shows that Kurds of Jabrayil, Arash and partly Javanshir spoke Azeri as a first language. According to the first Soviet census of 1926, only 3,100 (or 8.3%) of Azerbaijan's Kurdish population (which at the time numbered 37,200 people) spoke Kurdish.

A well-integrated community, Kurds were represented in the government of the shortly independent Democratic Republic of Azerbaijan in 1918–1920, among them Nurmammad bey Shahsuvarov who served as Minister of Education and Religious Affairs and Khosrov bey Sultanov, Minister of the Military and Governor General of Karabakh and Zangezur.

Red Kurdistan 
After the establishment of the Soviet rule in Azerbaijan, the Central Executive Committee of the Azerbaijan SSR created in 1923 an administrative unit known as Red Kurdistan in the districts of Lachin, Qubadli and Zangilan, with its capital in Lachin. According to the 1926 census, 73% of its population was Kurdish and 26% was Azeri. In 1930 it was abolished and most remaining Kurds were progressively recategorized as Azerbaijani. In the 1930s, a traditional Kurdish puppet theatre kilim arasi in Aghjakand and a Kurdish Pedagogical College in Lachin still functioned. Soviet authorities deported most of the Kurdish population of Azerbaijan and Armenia to Kazakhstan in 1937, and Kurds of Georgia in 1944. Starting from 1961, there were efforts by deportees for the restoration of their rights, spearheaded by Mehmet Babayev who lived in Baku, which proved to be futile.

Kurds continued to assimilate into the dominant culture of the neighbouring Azeris. Historically mixed Azeri-Kurdish marriages were commonplace; however the Kurdish language was rarely passed on to the children in such marriages.

Nagorno-Karabakh War 
The First Nagorno-Karabakh War between Armenia and Azerbaijan spilled across the region of Nagorno-Karabakh into the traditionally Kurdish populated areas in both of these countries.In the late 1980s 18,000 Kurds left from Armenia to Azerbaijan.  In 1992–1993, Armenian troops advanced into Kalbajar, Lachin, Qubadli and Zangilan, forcing the non-Armenian civilian population out. As much as 80% of the Kurdish population of those regions settled in IDP camps in Aghjabadi.

Demographics
Estimates from the 1920s put the population of the Kurds in Azerbaijan at around 40 thousand.
 Estimates in the 1990s varied from as low as 10 thousand to as high as 200 thousand.

Influential Kurds from Azerbaijan
Shamil Asgarov, poet and folklorist
 Isgandar Khan Khoyski, decorated Imperial Russian and Azerbaijani military commander, having the rank of lieutenant-general
 Wekil Mustafayev, former Leader of Short lived Kurdistan Uyezd in today‘s West-Azerbaijan
 Firudin Shamoyev, Azerbaijani soldier
 Kamil Nasibov, Azerbaijani soldier
 Vazir Orujov, Azerbaijani soldier
 Khosrow Mustafayev, Azerbaijani police officer and participant in the 1995 Azerbaijani coup d'état attempt

References

Ethnic groups in Azerbaijan
Kurdish diaspora
Iranian peoples in the Caucasus
Ethnic groups in the Middle East